Barbara Stanisława Trzetrzelewska (Polish: , born 30 September 1954), better known as Basia, is a Polish singer-songwriter and recording artist noted for her Latin-inspired jazz-pop music. She began singing professionally in various Polish bands from the late 1960s throughout the 1970s, then relocated to the UK in 1981. She rose to fame as a singer in the British trio Matt Bianco. By 1986, Basia and her bandmate Danny White had left the group to focus on her solo career. She signed on with Epic Records and enjoyed a successful international career between 1987 and 1995, particularly in the USA where her first two albums Time and Tide and London Warsaw New York were platinum-certified, million-unit sellers. During that period, her biggest hits were "Time and Tide", "New Day for You", "Promises", "Baby You're Mine", "Cruising for Bruising", and "Drunk on Love". She had also built up a fan base in Asia. She took a lengthy hiatus due to personal tragedies, then made a comeback to regular recording and performing in the late 2000s. She currently releases her music through independent labels.

Biography

1954–1984: Early life and career 
Basia was born in Jaworzno, Poland in 1954. She had three siblings – two brothers and a sister – and her parents ran a popular ice cream parlor in the town's centre. Growing up in a musical household, Basia enjoyed singing from an early age and had an extensive collection of vinyl records. Her mother played piano and gave her first music lessons.

In 1969, Basia debuted as a vocalist in local band Astry and performed with them at the National Festival of Beat Avangarde in Kalisz where they came first. Always good at exact sciences, Basia was intending on studying mathematics at the Jagiellonian University, but eventually took up physics. On the first year of the course she was approached by the manager of the popular Polish all-female band Alibabki who offered her performing with the group. Basia accepted the offer, dropped out of the university and started to perform with Alibabki in 1972. She toured with them in Poland and abroad, mostly in the Eastern Bloc countries, until 1974. In 1976, Basia took part in the National Festival of Polish Song in Opole as a soloist to no success. From 1977 to 1979, she performed in Polish rock band Perfect.

Basia relocated to London with her partner in January 1981 and went on to record demo tracks for various artists. It was there that she met Danny White (brother of jazz guitarist Peter White) and his collaborator Mark Reilly. The trio performed in 1983 as Bronze, but later changed the name to Matt Bianco. Their debut album Whose Side Are You On? was released in 1984 and turned out a hit across Europe. It spawned Matt Bianco's UK Top 40 singles "Get Out of Your Lazy Bed" and "Half a Minute".

1985–1999: Solo career 
Despite the success, Basia and Danny left Matt Bianco in 1985 to focus on Basia's solo career, marking the beginning of a longtime collaboration which lasts to date. Their first release was the single "Prime Time TV" in 1986 which was a minor charts success in the UK and Germany. Basia's first solo album, Time and Tide, was released in 1987 and initially met with mixed commercial success, selling well in France but performing poorly in the rest of Europe. Accompanying singles "New Day for You" and "Promises" were only modest successes too. The album fared much better in the US where it found popularity on the smooth jazz radio stations. The song "Time and Tide" was Basia's first hit on Billboard Hot 100, peaking at no. 26 in 1988, followed by "New Day for You" and "Promises" both reaching the top 10 on the Adult Contemporary chart in 1989. The album was certified platinum by the Recording Industry Association of America in November 1989 for selling one million copies in the US alone. Worldwide, it sold almost two million copies.

The second album, London Warsaw New York, recorded in 1989 and released in early 1990, was promoted by the popular singles "Baby You're Mine" and "Cruising for Bruising". The latter peaked in the top 40 on both US and Canadian singles chart and turned out Basia's biggest hit yet. The album also included the cover of Stevie Wonder-penned track "Until You Come Back to Me" which was a minor hit on the Adult Contemporary chart. London Warsaw New York was another commercial success, selling in over two million units worldwide, including more than one million in the US, earning Basia her second platinum certification there. It also became Billboards Contemporary Jazz Album of 1990. The album was a strong seller in Japan which at that point had become Basia's second main market. The LP was supported by an extensive tour spanning the US, Europe and Japan. On the back of Basia's continuing success, her label released Brave New Hope, a compilation consisting of remixes and rare tracks.

Her third studio album, The Sweetest Illusion, was released in spring 1994. Mixed by the then-highly sought after David Bascombe, the project marked the end of a ten-year working relationship with mixmaster Phil Harding and a step into more sophisticated territory. The Sweetest Illusion included a number-one hit on the Billboard Dance Club Songs chart, "Drunk on Love", and the moderately successful song "Third Time Lucky". Although it did not match the commercial performance of Basia's two previous albums, it still reached the top 40 on the US charts and received gold certification from the RIAA for selling over half a million copies. The album turned out a bigger success in Japan where it peaked in the top 10 and was her best-selling record yet, eventually receiving platinum sales award. To support The Sweetest Illusion, Basia again embarked on a long tour in the US, Japan and Europe, where she played her first ever solo concerts in Poland. She recorded a 16-song live album, Basia on Broadway during the New York City leg of that tour. 

In 1996, Basia contributed vocals to Peter White's song "Just Another Day" which was released as a single from his album Caravan of Dreams. A retrospective compilation album, Clear Horizon – The Best of Basia, was released in 1998, consisting of notable chart hits, non-single tracks, and new material, including a cover of "Waters of March", written by Brazilian composer Antônio Carlos Jobim. The compilation was Basia's last release for Sony and was a minor success, only in Japan, largely due to lack of promotion from the label.

2000–present: Hiatus and comeback 
Basia withdrew from the music industry when her mother, to whom she was very close, died in December 2000. Not long after that, her cousin died in a car accident which was followed by the passing of other close friends. The singer struggled with depression, lost motivation to work and thought she would never return to singing. After some persistent efforts from Danny White and Mark Reilly, who had started working together again, she agreed to join reformed Matt Bianco. The band released the album Matt's Mood in 2004 to critical acclaim and modest chart success. The positive response to Matt Bianco's reunion and pleas from her fans encouraged Basia to work on her next solo album. Having finished touring with the band in 2006, Basia and Danny began working on the new material together while Reilly continued with Matt Bianco.

Her fourth solo studio album, It's That Girl Again, was finally released in spring 2009 by independent label Koch Records. It was promoted by the ballad "A Gift" on the Polish radio while "Blame It on the Summer" served as the lead single on the American market. The album met with critical as well as commercial success, placing in the top 10 of the US Jazz Albums chart and the top 5 in her native Poland where it was certified platinum. Basia toured extensively in Europe, East Asia and North America to promote It's That Girl Again. A 2011 concert in Łódź, Poland was recorded for her second live album, From Newport to London: Greatest Hits Live ... and More, released in autumn that year. The album additionally featured three studio recordings, including the title song, released as the lead single, and "Wandering", a duet with Polish singer Mietek Szcześniak. They recorded one more song together, a cover of Vanessa Williams' hit "Save the Best for Last", produced by its original co-writer Wendy Waldman, this time for Szcześniak's album Signs. In March 2013, Basia performed a full show at Java Jazz Festival in Jakarta, Indonesia.

Basia recorded duets with Polish artists Monika Lidke and the band Pectus for their respective albums, simultaneously working on the new solo album. In 2014, she was ordered with the Commander's Cross of Polonia Restituta for promoting Polish culture worldwide, and the following year, she received the Medal for Merit to Culture – Gloria Artis. Her fifth solo studio album, Butterflies, was finally released in May 2018, preceded by the single "Matteo". It received positive reviews and charted in the top 5 on the Jazz Albums chart in the US, and the top 20 in Poland. The accompanying concert tour spanned the US, Poland and East Asia. In November 2019, Basia was honored with the Kosciuszko Foundation Pioneer Award.

Influence 
Basia's biggest influence has always been American music, particularly soul and jazz. Her songs are also inspired by Latin American music, especially Brazilian, and such genres as bossa nova and samba. She has cited Aretha Franklin, Stevie Wonder, Burt Bacharach, Astrud Gilberto and Antônio Carlos Jobim as some of her musical influences.

The singer is noted for possessing a wide vocal range, approximately three octaves.

Basia has always tried to incorporate Polish elements into her otherwise English-language songs. Her native language can be heard in "Half a Minute" from Matt Bianco's debut album, in "Wrong Side of the Street" from Matt's Mood, in "Copernicus" and "Reward" from London Warsaw New York, as well as "An Olive Tree" and "Yearning" from The Sweetest Illusion. The singer has also released two songs performed entirely in Polish: the concert album Basia on Broadway features a live recording of "Dzień się budzi" (English: "The Day Is Dawning"), and It's That Girl Again includes "Amelki śmiech" ("Amelka's Laughter").

Personal life 
Basia has one son, Mikołaj, born in the late 1970s. At the turn of the 1970s and 1980s, her partner was an Englishman named John, a social worker with whom she briefly lived in Chicago and subsequently moved to the UK. In the second half of the 1980s, the singer was in a relationship with her musical collaborator Danny White. Since 1991, Basia's partner has been musician Kevin Robinson, a member of Simply Red, with whom she resides in London's suburbs. Basia also maintains a house in her Polish hometown Jaworzno and divides her time between the two countries. She holds dual Polish and British citizenship.

Basia is an avid lover of architecture and has called it her "unfulfilled passion".

Discography 

 1987: Time and Tide
 1990: London Warsaw New York
 1994: The Sweetest Illusion
 1995: Basia on Broadway
 1998: Clear Horizon – The Best of Basia
 2009: It's That Girl Again
 2011: From Newport to London: Greatest Hits Live ... and More
 2018: Butterflies

References

External links 

 
 Official YouTube channel

1954 births
21st-century Polish women singers
21st-century Polish singers
Ballad musicians
English-language singers from Poland
MNRK Music Group artists
Jazz-pop singers
Knights of the Order of Polonia Restituta
Living people
People from Jaworzno
Polish emigrants to the United Kingdom
Polish jazz singers
Polish soul singers
Recipients of the Silver Medal for Merit to Culture – Gloria Artis
Smooth jazz singers
Sophisti-pop musicians